HMS Itchen was a Laird-type River-class destroyer ordered by the Royal Navy under the 1901–1902 Naval Estimates.  Named after the River Itchen in southern England near Southampton, she was the first ship to carry this name in the Royal Navy.

Construction
She was laid down on 18 August 1902 at the Cammell Laird shipyard at Birkenhead and launched on 13 March 1903.  She was completed in January 1904.  Her original armament was to be the same as the Turleback torpedo boat destroyers that preceded her.  In 1906 the Admiralty decided to upgrade the armament by landing the five 6-pounder naval guns and shipping three 12-pounder 8 hundredweight (cwt) guns.  Two would be mounted abeam at the fo'c's'le break and the third gun would be mounted on the quarterdeck.

Pre-War
After commissioning she was assigned to the East Coast Destroyer Flotilla of the 1st Fleet and based at Harwich.

On 27 April 1908 the Eastern Flotilla departed Harwich for live fire and night manoeuvres.  During these exercises HMS Attentive rammed and sank HMS Gala then damaged HMS Ribble.

In April 1909 she was assigned to the 3rd Destroyer Flotilla of the 1st Fleet on its formation at Harwich.

Itchen ran aground North-west of Kirkwall on 20 September 1909. She was refloated two days later, and after temporary repairs at Kirkwall before undergoing more permanent repairs at Chatham Dockyard. She remained until displaced by a Basilisk Class destroyer by May 1912.  She went into reserve assigned to the 5th Destroyer Flotilla of the 2nd Fleet with a nucleus crew.

On 30 August 1912 the Admiralty directed all destroyer classes were to be designated by alpha characters starting with the letter "A".  The ships of the River Class were assigned to the E Class.  After  30 September 1913, she was known as an E Class destroyer and had the letter "E" painted on the hull below the bridge area and on either the fore or aft funnel.

World War I
In early 1914 when displaced by G Class destroyers she joined the 9th Destroyer Flotilla based at Chatham tendered to HMS St George.  The 9th Flotilla was a Patrol Flotilla tasked with anti-submarine and counter mining patrols in the Firth of Forth area.  By September 1914, she was deployed to the Scapa Flow Local Flotilla.  Here she provided anti-submarine and counter mining patrols in defence of the main fleet anchorage.

Loss
On 6 July 1917 Itchen was torpedoed in the North Sea by German submarine UC-44 70 miles NNE of Peterhead, Scotland with the loss of 8 officers and men.  She sank at position .

She was not awarded a Battle Honour for her service.

Pennant Numbers

References

Bibliography
 
 
 
 
 
 
 

 

River-class destroyers
1903 ships
Ships built on the River Mersey
Maritime incidents in 1917
Ships sunk by German submarines in World War I
World War I shipwrecks in the North Sea